La ville morte is an opera by Nadia Boulanger and Raoul Pugno to the text of Gabriele D'Annunzio's play . It has been called Boulanger's "most significant achievement as a creative artist".

History
After hearing her examinations at the Conservatoire de Paris in 1904, Pugno became Boulanger's teacher, collaborator and promotor. Some writers say that Pugno and Boulanger became lovers, while others do not. In 1909 they wrote a song cycle, Les heures claires, together. Work on the opera probably began in 1909 and was finished in 1912. Pugno died on 3 January 1914, before the opera could have its premier. Opéra-Comique had finished casting by July 1914, and choir rehearsals were scheduled to start on August 17 that same year when the outbreak of World War I disrupted all plans. With many echoes of Pelléas et Mélisande, the story follows the lives and loves of an archeologist, Léonard, his sister Hebé, Alexandre, a colleague, and his wife Anne, amidst the ruins of Mycenae.

A fully orchestrated version of the opera has not survived. The opera was reconstructed from surviving scores by Mauro Bonifacio and had its world premiere at the 2005 Chigiana festival in Siena. It was performed for the second time in a concert staging by Mia Nerenius, using screens and projections, in March 2020 at the Gothenburg Opera.

In January 2019 the opera was planned to be performed in the spring of 2021 in the United States.

Roles

References

Citations

Bibliography 

French-language operas
Operas based on plays
1912 operas
Operas
Operas based on works by Gabriele D'Annunzio